Minuscule 1241 (in the Gregory-Aland numbering), δ371 (Soden), is a Greek minuscule manuscript of the New Testament, on parchment, attributed through palaeography to the twelfth century. The text contains most of the New Testament, lacking the Book of Revelation, and is notable for its diversity between Alexandrian and Byzantine textual variants, and for its numerous scribal errors.

It remains housed at Saint Catherine's Monastery, in Egypt, the site of its original discovery.

See also 

 List of New Testament minuscules
 Biblical manuscript
 Textual criticism

References

Further reading 

 

Greek New Testament minuscules
12th-century biblical manuscripts